Hede Bühl (8 June 1940, Haan, near Düsseldorf) is a German sculptor who lives and works in Düsseldorf. She studied under Joseph Beuys and worked in the studio of Ewald Mataré. Her work has received numerous awards, including the Villa Romana prize (1973),  the Villa Massimo fellowship (1979), and the Käthe Kollwitz Prize from the Academy of Arts, Berlin (2007).

References

Further reading 
 Hede Bühl: Skulpturen und Zeichnungen. Exhibit catalog, 1985, 
 Hede Bühl: Köpfe. Museum für Kunst und Kulturgeschichte, Lübeck 1990

External links 
 
 Entry for Hede Bühl on the Union List of Artist Names
 Biography of Hede Bühl from the Haus der Kunst

20th-century German sculptors
21st-century German sculptors
German women sculptors
Artists from Düsseldorf
1940 births
Living people
20th-century German women artists
21st-century German women artists